Wangchang may refer to the following places:

Wangchang Gewog, a gewog (village group) in Paro District, Bhutan

Places in China
Wangchang, Chongqing (王场), a town in Shizhu Tujia Autonomous County, Chongqing
Wangchang, Qianjiang (王场), a town in Qianjiang, Hubei
Wangchang, Tianmen (汪场), a town in Tianmen, Hubei
Wangchang, Sichuan (王场), a town in Chongzhou, Sichuan
Wangchang Township (王常乡), a township in Zaoqiang County, Hebei

See also
Wang Chang (disambiguation) for a list of people
Wanchang (disambiguation)
Wangcheng (disambiguation)